Spring Garden Street station was a train station in the Poplar neighborhood of Philadelphia. It was built by the Reading Railroad and located on the Reading Viaduct. Service to Spring Garden Street ended in 1984 with the opening of the Center City Commuter Connection, which bypassed the Reading Terminal, and the building was demolished in 2021.

History 

Spring Garden Street was built adjacent to the old Philadelphia, Germantown and Norristown Railroad depot at Ninth and Green, which had opened in 1851. Ninth and Green had been the primary Philadelphia terminal of the Philadelphia and Reading Railroad since 1879 and the Reading had outgrown the facility. Reading Terminal was linked to the existing railway line by a new elevated route carried by the Reading Viaduct. Spring Garden Street was built to serve the elevated route. Both it and Reading Terminal opened on January 29, 1893, although the Spring Garden Street station building was not completed and tickets had to be purchased at Ninth and Green. Ninth and Green would remain open as a freight-only building until 1909, when it was demolished to permit additional track elevation.

Spring Garden Street remained in use until 1984, when the new Center City Commuter Connection opened. In March 2021, Reading International, the successor company to the Reading Company, filed paperwork to demolish the building. Arts & Crafts Holdings – a real estate development company – and nonprofit Scioli Turco sought a conservatorship over the building. Reading International handles the company's legacy properties and rights-of-ways. Nevertheless, Philadelphia's Department of Licenses & Inspections issued a permit to Reading International to demolish the station. Demolition began in May 2021.

References 

Former Reading Company stations
Railway stations in the United States opened in 1893
Railway stations closed in 1984
1893 establishments in Pennsylvania
1984 disestablishments in Pennsylvania
Poplar, Philadelphia
Former SEPTA Regional Rail stations
Former railway stations in Philadelphia
Buildings and structures demolished in 2021
Demolished buildings and structures in Philadelphia